The Southeast Asia Weekly (SEA) is a weekly newspaper by English and Khmer language published in Phnom Penh, Cambodia. It got a license in 2006 by the Ministry of Information and changed its name from The Cambodia Weekly to The Southeast Asia Weekly.  It is printed in full-color tabloid format. The Southeast Asia Weekly is a not-for-profit newspaper that is affiliated with the University of Cambodia. All the content, views and opinions published pertain strictly to The Southeast Asia Weekly, and in no way reflect the views and policies of The University of Cambodia. The content of newspaper focus on three main pillars: education, culture and information.

External links
 The Southeast Asia Weekly
 The Cambodia Weekly Announces New Name - University of Cambodia

Newspapers published in Cambodia
Mass media in Phnom Penh
Publications established in 2006
Weekly newspapers